The 2012 Monterrey Open was a women's tennis tournament played on outdoor hard courts. It was the 4th edition of the Monterrey Open and was an International tournament on the 2012 WTA Tour. It took place at the Sierra Madre Tennis Club in Monterrey, Mexico, from 20 to 26 February. Tímea Babos won the singles title.

Singles main-draw entrants

Seeds

Rankings as of 13 February 2012

Other entrants
The following players received wildcards into the main draw:
  Sorana Cîrstea
  Ximena Hermoso
  Yaroslava Shvedova

The following players received entry via qualifying:
  Maria Abramović
  Sesil Karatantcheva
  Katalin Marosi
  Monica Puig

Withdrawals
  Romina Oprandi
  Serena Williams (left knee injury)

Doubles main-draw entrants

Seeds

1 Rankings are as of 13 February 2012

Other entrants
The following pairs received wildcards into the doubles main draw:
  Ana Paula de la Peña /  Ivette López
  Gisela Dulko /  Paola Suárez

Champions

Singles

 Tímea Babos def.  Alexandra Cadanțu, 6–4, 6–4
It was Babos' 1st career title.

Doubles

 Sara Errani /  Roberta Vinci def.  Kimiko Date-Krumm /  Zhang Shuai, 6–2, 7–6(8–6)

References & External links

Official website

Monterrey Open
Monterrey Open
2012 in Mexican tennis